Nivar-e Olya (also Romanized as Nīvār-e ‘Olyā; also known as Nīvār and Nīvār-e Bālā) is a village in Sornabad Rural District, Hamaijan District, Sepidan County, Fars Province, Iran. At the 2006 census, its population was 124, in 32 families.

References 

Populated places in Sepidan County